Lucky Fritz is a 2009 German comedy film starring Corey Feldman. The story is a modern fairy tale.

Plot
Lucky Fritz was hit by a lightning strike twice. That's why he is called "Lucky" Fritz. He lives on the countryside and works in a small café. Besides waiting on people he earns a little extra money by selling local guests worms for angling. 
One day his best friend tells him the famous actress Leslie Lutrell is about to shoot a film in the surroundings of their little town. His friend craves to meet the star and even tries to prepare for that by torturing himself with a "slim belt". But Lucky Fritz only cares for Gretchen, the local beauty.
Against all odds Lucky Fritz is hit by a lightning strike for a third time. Unfortunately there are after-effects. His skin has become magnetic and his mere touch makes people being infatuated with him. When  the capricious Leslie Lutrell spontaneously visits his café, she also falls for him.
Leslie Lutrell openly shows his affection for him but Lucky Fritz doesn't trust his magic skill. In spite of his reluctance Leslie still pursues him. Lucky Fritz is anxious Gretchen might get the wrong impression. He is also terrified by paparazzi and by Leslie's jealous boy-friend. 
Eventually Leslie has him hired as a supporting actor. Lucky Fritz starts to behave as if he was a star. Now Gretchen is clearly disgusted and Leslie must return to Hollywood for a preliminary report. While Leslie and Lucky are separated, the effects of his magic touch fade off and henceforth she will refuse to let him touch her. 
Lucky feels like he was cursed and tries to get hit by a lightning strike once again for he hopes that might restore his normality and give him finally a chance to win Gretchen's heart.

Cast
Corey Feldman as Lucky Fritz 
 as J.D. Miller 
Nina Kristin as Leslie Lutrell 
Julia Dietze as Gretchen Henderlein 
Axel Wedekind as Brad Bowman 
Priscilla Bergey as Annie Ruth 
Robert Lyons as Ted Munson 
Pierre Shrady as Luther Sander 
Eva-Maria Kurz as Ms. Hafergrass 
Tom Strauss as Ol' Kurt 
Eve Slatner as Martha 
Peter Farkas as preacher 
Ben Posener as Doctor 
Clayton Nemrow as Iceman 
Harvey Friedman as journalist

Production notes
As the director conceded in an interview on the German-English DVD the film had to be shot in 12 days only. It was shot in English and no actor was dubbed. Director Stephen Manuel found many English native-speakers in Germany as he explains in the German commentary.

External links

 

German romantic comedy films
2009 films
English-language German films
2009 romantic comedy films
2000s English-language films
2000s German films